Guanghan (formerly known as Hanchow) is a county-level city under the administration of Deyang in Sichuan province, southwest China,  and only  from Chengdu. The predominant industries are tourism, pharmaceuticals and the supply of building material.

A major part of the tourism is the nearby Sanxingdui ruins. The striking exhibits at the Sanxingdui Museum highlight archaeological finds that some Chinese archaeologists regard as even more important than the Terracotta Army.

The region is steadily becoming more industrialised and that is helping with the progression of agriculture and enhances the region's development.

Education
Civil Aviation Flight University of China (CAFUC) is famous for educating the dominant majority of Chinese civil aviation pilots and air traffic controllers.

Universities and Colleges include:

 Civil Aviation Flight University of China
 Sichuan Normal University (Guanghang)
 Sichuan Aerospace Polytechnic
 National Judges College  (Sichuan)

Climate

References

 
County-level cities in Sichuan
Deyang